Soritia is a genus of moths belonging to the family Zygaenidae.

The species of this genus are found in Western Africa and Southeastern Asia.

Species
Species:

Soritia angustipennis 
Soritia azurea 
Soritia bicolor 
Soritia binotata 
Soritia cecilia 
Soritia choui 
Soritia circinata 
Soritia costimacula 
Soritia elizabetha 
Soritia lydia 
Soritia moerens 
Soritia nigribasalis 
Soritia pulchella 
Soritia risa 
Soritia sevastopuloi 
Soritia shahama 
Soritia strandi 
Soritia viridibasalis

References

Zygaenidae
Zygaenidae genera